Stephen Lee Bun-sang (born 10 November 1956, in Hong Kong; in ) is a Roman Catholic priest, numerary member of Opus Dei, former auxiliary bishop of Hong Kong, and the current bishop of Macau.

Born in Hong Kong Lee entered the priesthood in 1988 and became Auxiliary Bishop of Hong Kong in 2014 and Bishop of Macau in 2016 succeeding Bishop José Lai Hung-seng.

See also 
 List of bishops of Macau
 Diocese of Macau
 Opus Dei

References

1956 births
21st-century Roman Catholic bishops in Macau
Hong Kong Christian clergy
Hong Kong expatriates in Spain
Hong Kong Roman Catholic bishops
Opus Dei members
Living people
University of Navarra alumni